Chhim Sothy (born 1969 in Kandal Province) is an acclaimed Cambodian painter and sculptor noted for his ability in a diverse number of artistic techniques and mediums.

Background
Chhim Sothy was born in 1969 in Kandal Province.

Exhibitions
2005: Victoria Hotels and Resorts, Siem Reap, Cambodia.
2004: Fealac Art Exhibit Guidelines in Manila, Philippine.
2004: French Cultural Center Phnom Penh, Cambodia.
2004: Maison du Chevalier, Carcasonne, France.
2004: Ganesha Gallery, Phnom Penh, Cambodia.
2003: "Vision of Future", Reyum Gallery, Phnom Penh, Cambodia.
2003: 60th Celebration of Silapakorn University, Bangkok, Thailand.
2003: Le Royal, Raffles International Hotel, Phnom Penh, Cambodia.
2002: Providence College, Rhode Island, USA.
2002: French Cultural Center Siem Reap, Cambodia.
2002: National Cultural Center, Phnom Penh, Cambodia.

Awards
2004: 1st prize of Painting (Future of Culture), Phnom Penh, Cambodia.
2003: 1st prize of Painting (Life and Nature), Ministry of Culture and Fine Arts, Phnom Penh, Cambodia.
2003: 2nd prize of "Utopies, Dream or Reality", French Cultural Center, Phnom Penh, Cambodia.
2000: 1st prize of traditional painting by the Plastic arts and Crafts Department, Phnom Penh, Cambodia.
2000: Asean Art Awards, Singapore, Phillip Moris Group

References

External links
https://web.archive.org/web/20070928063852/http://saklapel.org/vao/artists/chhim_sothy/
http://www.angkorfineart.com/ChhimSothybio

1969 births
Cambodian artists
Cambodian sculptors
Living people
20th-century Cambodian artists
21st-century Cambodian artists
People from Kandal province